Ramesh Manjula was a Sri Lankan cricketer. He was a left-handed batsman who played for Kalutara Town Club.

Manjula made a single first-class appearance for the team during the 1996-97 Saravanamuttu Trophy campaign, Kalutara's only season in first-class cricket, against Singha Sports Club. Batting from the lower order, Manjula hit six runs in the first innings in which he batted, and three runs in the second.

Manjula bowled nearly three overs in the game, conceding nine runs.

References

External links
Ramesh Manjula at CricketArchive 

Sri Lankan cricketers
Kalutara Town Club cricketers
Living people
Year of birth missing (living people)
Place of birth missing (living people)